Tiger Devore, previously known as Howard Devore and Tiger Howard Devore, is an American clinical psychologist, sex therapist, and spokesperson on intersex issues. He is a former member of the now defunct Intersex Society of North America. Historian Alice Dreger credits him with starting the work of the intersex movement.

Early life 
Tiger Devore was born with severe hypospadias and has experienced over 20 surgeries and four full reconstructions. He says that, "all the surgeries I suffered up to age 19 were unnecessary failures."

Devore has a PhD in clinical psychology and works as a sex therapist, activist and educator with over 30 years of experience in advocacy for intersex people and others who are sexually different from the mainstream. Devore has worked in research clinics at the Johns Hopkins Hospital Medical School, and the Human Sexuality Program at UCLA. During his time at Johns Hopkins University, he worked with the sexologist John Money. He has also worked for NIH as a crisis counsellor and worked with imprisoned sex offenders.

Activism 

Alice Dreger describes how Devore, through his work at Johns Hopkins University and as an "out gay man in the 1970s-1980s in America" developed an awareness about "the clinical abuse of sexual minorities". He began to work as an educator and appeared on the Oprah show in 1984, considered to be the first television appearance by an intersex person talking about lived experiences. Dreger describes how Cheryl Chase was referred to him in November 1992, how Devore "taught her about the value of mutual support groups", and how, in 1993, Chase announced the establishment of the Intersex Society of North America (ISNA). Dreger states that:

Dreger states that, despite the expertize offered by Devore and Chase at that time, "reporters and producers generally counted Devore and Laurent only as intersex subjects, while I counted as a supposedly objective expert". She states that these reforms still remain to be implemented in 2018. Devore continues to argue in favor of fully informed consent by intersex people to genital surgeries. He states:

Devore has also argued against the use of disorders of sex development, as a term that is "more scientific," and "more medical," but also more treatable, and more of a stigma. In a statement in November 2015, Devore called for an end to unnecessary surgeries and "recognition of the rights of the child to bodily integrity and self determination", stating "that medicine and the research community continue to co-opt patient advocates in order to silence them by giving us the impression that we had access to influencing medical practice and research."

He is a board member, and former president, of the Hypospadias and Epispadias Association, and a former member of the now defunct Intersex Society of North America.

Selected bibliography

Media 
Devore has been an educator and media spokesperson on intersex issues since 1984 when he appeared on Oprah. He has appeared in documentaries for Discovery Channel (2000), PBS, National Geographic Channel television, the British Broadcasting Corporation, and the award-winning short movie XXXY by Stanford University. Devore is also interviewed in the 2012 documentary Intersexion. In 2013, he was interviewed by Time Magazine on the then-new German birth certificate laws, and called for a global ban on "normalizing surgeries." Devore was interviewed on the Howard Stern Show on 7/28/1999. http://www.marksfriggin.com/news99/7-26-99.htm

References

External links

Living people
Intersex men
Intersex rights activists
1958 births
Intersex rights in the United States
21st-century American psychologists
American sexuality activists
American sex educators
20th-century American psychologists